The half eagle is a  United States coin that was produced for circulation from 1795 to 1929 and in commemorative and bullion coins since 1983.  Composed almost entirely of gold, its face value of five dollars is half that of the eagle coin.  Production of the half eagle was authorized by the Coinage Act of 1792, and it was the first gold coin minted by the United States.

Turban Head

The design and composition of the half eagle changed many times over the years; it was originally designed by Keenan Barber Ganz. At this time the coin contained .9167 gold and .0833 copper and silver. The obverse design, or "Turban Head", depicted a capped portrait of Liberty facing to the right. The reverse depicted a small eagle. This type was produced from 1795 to 1798. Simultaneously, another type was minted that depicted a larger heraldic eagle on the reverse with the inscription "E PLURIBUS UNUM". This type was produced through 1807.

Draped Bust

From 1807 to 1812, a new type designed, titled the "Draped Bust" (also referred to as the "Capped Bust"), was produced by John Reich. The "Draped Bust" design featured a round-capped Liberty facing left on the obverse and a modified eagle on the reverse.  For the first time, the value "5 D." was placed on the reverse of the coin to indicate its value.  In 1813 a modified version of the Draped Bust was introduced, removing much of the bustline ("Capped Head") and giving Liberty an overall larger appearance. This design lasted through 1834. Another modification occurred in 1829 when the diameter of the coin was reduced slightly to 23.8 mm, although the overall design remained unchanged.

Classic Head

By 1834, the gold in the half eagle had been worth more than its face value for several years. The Act of June 28, 1834 called for a reduction in the gold used.  The weight of the coin was reduced to 8.36 grams, the diameter reduced to 22.5 mm, and the composition changed to .8992 gold and .1008 silver and copper.  A new obverse, the "Classic Head", was created by William Kneass for the altered coin.  The reverse still depicted the modified eagle introduced in 1813, but "E PLURIBUS UNUM" was removed to distinguish further the new composition. On January 18, 1837, the gold content of this type was increased to .900 in accordance with the Coinage Act of 1837.

Liberty Head

In 1839 the coin was redesigned again.  The new obverse was designed by Christian Gobrecht  and is known as the "Liberty Head or "Coronet head".  The reverse design remained largely the same, although the value was changed from "5 D." to "FIVE D.".

For those struck at the Philadelphia Mint, there was no longer any silver in the coin - its composition was now .900 gold and .100 copper.  However, gold ore used at the southern branch mints of Charlotte and Dahlonega had a high natural silver content, and many of these coins contained up to five percent silver, giving them a distinct so-called "green gold" color.

Its weight was virtually the same, 8.359 grams, but the diameter  was reduced one final time, to 21.6 mm, in 1840, for a gold content of 0.242 Troy Oz.  This design was used for nearly 70 years, from 1839 to 1908, with a modest change in 1866, when "IN GOD WE TRUST" was placed on the reverse above the eagle.

The Liberty Head half eagle is the only coin of a single design to be minted at seven U.S. Mints: Philadelphia, Dahlonega, Charlotte, New Orleans, San Francisco, Carson City, and Denver.

Scarcer dates and coins of higher grades can be worth much more, and all Charlotte, Carson City and Dahlonega pieces are scarce and valuable.

Indian Head

In 1908, the final type was first produced and designed by Bela Lyon Pratt.  The composition, weight, and diameter of the coin remained unchanged, but both the obverse and reverse were drastically altered.  The new design matched the new quarter eagle design of the same date.  These two series are unique in United States coinage because the design and inscriptions are stamped in incuse, rather than being raised from the surface, meaning that the flat surfaces are the highest points of the coin.  The obverse depicted a Native American head wearing a feathered headdress.  The reverse depicted a perched eagle with the inscriptions "E PLURIBUS UNUM" and "IN GOD WE TRUST". Production of the half eagle was suspended during World War I and not resumed until 1929, the final year of issue.

Due to higher demand common date Indian Head half eagles tend to be worth slightly more than common date Liberty Head half eagles.

Distinctions
The $5 denomination has the distinction of being the only denomination for which coins were minted at eight US mints.  Prior to 1838 all half eagles were minted in Philadelphia because there were no other operating mints.  In 1838, the Charlotte Mint and the Dahlonega Mint produced half eagles of the Coronet type in their first years of operation, and continued to mint half eagles until 1861, their last year of operation.  The New Orleans Mint minted half eagles from 1840 to 1861.  The San Francisco Mint first produced half eagles in 1854, its first year of operation, as did Carson City in 1870, and Denver in 1906.

Although circulating half eagle production was discontinued in 1929, half eagle commemorative and $5 denominated (1/10 ounce) bullion coins were minted at West Point starting in the late twentieth century.

Proof coins were produced at Philadelphia from 1859 on.

List of circulating designs

Turban Head 1795–1807
Turban Head, Small Eagle 1795–1798
Turban Head, Large Eagle 1795–1807
Draped Bust 1807–1812
Capped Head 1813–1834
Classic Head 1834–1838
Liberty Head (Coronet) 1839–1908
Coronet, without motto 1839–1866
Coronet, with motto 1866–1908
Indian Head 1908–1916, 1929

References
A Guide Book of United States Coins (56th edition) by R.S. Yeoman ed. Kenneth Bressett, 2003
Complete U.S. Coin History

External links

"Rare Half Eagle" (Professional Coin Grading Service) 

1795 introductions
United States gold coins
Five-base-unit coins
Goddess of Liberty on coins
Eagles on coins